Alberta Provincial Highway No. 566 in the Canadian province of Alberta lies approximately halfway between Calgary and Airdrie, running west to east from Highway 772 (Symons Valley Road) to Highway 9 near the hamlets of Kathyrn and Keoma.

North of Calgary, from between Range Road 15 & 20 (Panorama Road (24 Street NW) & Mountain View Road) to Range Road 10A (20 Street NE), it is given the designation 176 Avenue N, however it does not enter city limits, with the boundary on the south side of the right of way.

Alberta Transportation has plans to upgrade Highway 566 to a divided expressway.

Major intersections 
Starting from the west end of Highway 566.

See also 

Transportation in Calgary

References 

Roads in Calgary
566